Leif Wenar  is an American Philosopher and Olive H. Palmer Professor in Humanities at Stanford University. He is known for his works on  political science.

Books
 Blood Oil: Tyrants, Violence, and the Rules that Run the World

References

External links

Living people
21st-century American philosophers
Stanford University faculty
Harvard University alumni
Year of birth missing (living people)